La dottoressa ci sta col colonnello (The doctor is there with Colonel) is a 1980 commedia sexy all'italiana directed by Michele Massimo Tarantini, starring  Lino Banfi with Nadia Cassini. The film is a late installment of the genre, combining 1970s' soldatessa and dottoressa themes (made popular by Edwige Fenech) with abundant absurd comedy elements a year after Cassini's breakthrough film L'insegnante balla... con tutta la classe.

Plot
Colonel Anacleto Punzone (Banfi) is a military doctor with expertise in organ transplantation. He has a small penis, leading to a frustrated sex life with his wife Giovanna (Malisa Longo). Furthermore, his penis size forces him to dodge sexual advances from an attractive colleague, Prof. Eva Russell (Cassini). Colonel now contemplates on the radical solution of penis transplantation, finding a potential donor in dim-witted and well-endowed Private Arturo Mazzancolla (Alvaro Vitali). During Prof. Russell's visits to the military hospital, Colonel realises that other men, including handsome Lieutenant Lancetti (Bruno Minniti) are interested in her and he feels that the operation is even more urgent; although he is not confident as it may result in some complications (like permanent erection or no erection).

Cast 
 Nadia Cassini - Dottoressa (Dr.) Eva Russell
 Lino Banfi - Colonnello Anacleto Punzone
 Alvaro Vitali - Arturo Mazzancolla
 Malisa Longo - Giovanna Punzone
 Bruno Minniti - Tenente Lancetti
 Lucio Montanaro - Suor Fulgenzia
 Enzo Andronico - Generale Mangiafuoco

References

External links

1980 films
Commedia sexy all'italiana
Films directed by Michele Massimo Tarantini
Military humor in film
1980s sex comedy films
1980 comedy films
1980s Italian-language films
1980s Italian films